The 2022 season was the Pittsburgh Steelers' 90th in the National Football League (NFL) and their 16th under head coach Mike Tomlin.

This was their first season since 2003 without long-time quarterback Ben Roethlisberger on the roster, as he announced his retirement on January 27, 2022. It was also the first season since 1999 without long-time general manager Kevin Colbert, as he announced on January 28, 2022 that after 22 years with the organization, he would step down following the 2022 NFL Draft. He was succeeded by Omar Khan as general manager and Andy Weidl as assistant general manager on May 25, 2022.

The Steelers began their season with a 2–6 record, their worst start since 2013, and failed to improve on their 9–7–1 record from 2021. Despite the initial setback, the Steelers would have a mid-season turnaround and stay in the playoff hunt through Week 18 and finished with a 9–8 record. However, they narrowly missed the playoffs—the Steelers tied with the Miami Dolphins for the last Wild Card spot, but lost the tiebreaker based on the teams' Week 7 head-to-head meeting, won by the Dolphins. They maintained their streak of 19 consecutive non-losing seasons.

Draft

Draft trades

Staff

Final roster

Preseason

Schedule

Regular season

Schedule

Note: Intra-division opponents are in bold text.

Game summaries

Week 1: at Cincinnati Bengals

The Steelers started the 2022 season against the division rival Bengals in Cincinnati.  The Steelers scored first in the first quarter when Minkah Fitzpatrick returned an interception 31 yards for a touchdown to make it 7–0.  The Bengals made it 7–3 when Evan McPhearson made a 59-yard field goal.  The Steelers then went ahead 10–3 after Chris Boswell kicked a 20-yard field goal.  In the second quarter, the Steelers moved ahead 17–3 after Mitchell Trubisky found Najee Harris on a 1-yard touchdown pass.  The Bengals drew closer at halftime when McPhearson made a 26-yard field goal to make it 17–6.  After the break, the Bengals came within 3 in the third quarter when Joe Burrow found Tyler Boyd on a 2-yard touchdown pass (with a successful 2-point conversion) to make it 17–14.  In the fourth quarter, the Steelers moved ahead by 6 when Boswell kicked a 48-yard field goal to make it 20–14.  Later on in the quarter, the Bengals tied the game when Burrow found Ja'Marr Chase on a 6-yard touchdown pass (with a blocked PAT) to send the game into overtime tied at 20–20.  After going back and forth on possessions, the Steelers managed to win the game when Boswell kicked the game winning 53-yard field goal with seconds left to make the final score 23–20.  

With their 3-game losing streak against the Bengals snapped, the Steelers started their season 1–0. Over the course of the game, the Steelers forced 5 turnovers.

Week 2: vs. New England Patriots

After a tough win in Week 1, the Steelers went home for their opener against the Patriots.  The Patriots scored first as Nick Folk kicked a 28-yard field goal 3–0 for the only score of the period.  The Steelers tied it up in the second quarter when Chris Boswell kicked a 36-yard field goal to make it 3–3.  The Patriots then took the lead when Mac Jones found Nelson Agholor on a 44-yard touchdown pass to make it 10–3 at halftime.  In the third quarter, the Steelers came within 4 when Boswell kicked a 52-yard field goal to make it 10–6.  Though, the Patriots would move ahead by double digits later on when Damien Harris ran for a 2-yard touchdown to make it 17–6.  The Steelers were able to come within 3 after Mitchell Trubisky found Pat Freiermuth on an 8-yard touchdown pass (with a successful 2-point conversion) to make it 17–14.  Though, they were unable to complete the comeback as the Patriots held on for the victory and ran out the clock.

With the loss, the Steelers fell to 1–1.

Week 3: at Cleveland Browns

After a tough loss at home to the Patriots, the Steelers traveled to Cleveland for Round 1 against the Browns.  In the first quarter, the Browns scored the only points when Jacoby Brissett found Amari Cooper on an 11-yard touchdown to make it 7–0.  The Steelers tied the game up in the second quarter when Najee Harris ran for a 5-yard touchdown to make it 7–7.  The Browns retook the lead when Brissett found David Njoku on a 7-yard pass (with a failed PAT) to make it 13–7. The Steelers then took the lead before halftime when Mitchell Trubisky ran for a 1-yard touchdown to make it 14–13.  In the third quarter, the Browns retook the lead when Cade York kicked a 34-yard field goal to make it 16–14 for the quarter's only score.  They increased their lead in the fourth quarter when Nick Chubb ran for a 1-yard touchdown to make it 23–14.  The Steelers came within 6 when Chris Boswell made a 34-yard field goal to make it 23–17.  The final play of the game came with no time left when Denzel Ward recovered a fumble in the end zone to make the final score 29–17.

With the loss, the Steelers fell to 1–2.

Week 4: vs. New York Jets

The Steelers headed home for a game against the Jets.  The Jets scored first in the first quarter when Greg Zuerlein kicked a 38-yard field goal to make it 3–0 for the quarter's only score.  They made it 10–0 in the second quarter when Zach Wilson connected with Braxton Berrios on a 2-yard touchdown pass.  The Steelers were able to get on the board before halftime in spite of 2 field goals from Boswell:  From 51 and 59 yards out to make it 10–6.  In the third quarter, the Steelers scored the only points when rookie QB Kenny Pickett ran for a 1-yard touchdown to make it 13–10.  In the fourth quarter, they increased their lead when Pickett ran for a 2-yard touchdown to make it 20–10.  The Jets drew closer when Wilson found Corey Davis on a 5-yard touchdown pass, making the score 20–17.  They later took the lead when Breece Hall ran for a 2-yard touchdown to make it 24–20.  The Steelers were able to drive down the field in the final seconds.  However, Pickett would throw the game-losing interception in the end zone and it sealed yet another loss for the team.

With the loss, the Steelers fell to 1–3.

Week 5: at Buffalo Bills

After a tough loss at home, the Steelers then traveled to take on the Bills.  The Bills scored first when Josh Allen found Gabe Davis on a 98-yard touchdown pass to make it 7–0.  The Steelers got on the board for their only points of the game when Chris Boswell kicked a 29-yard field goal to make it 7–3.  For the rest of the game, it was all Bills as they outscored the Steelers 31–0 to make the final score 38–3.

With the loss, the Steelers fell to 1–4.  This would be the largest margin of loss in Mike Tomlin's coaching career.  This would also be the team's first game without a touchdown since Week 1 of the 2019 season.

Week 6: vs. Tampa Bay Buccaneers

After a huge loss on the road, the Steelers returned home to face off against the Tom Brady-led Buccaneers. In the first quarter, the Steelers scored first when Najee Harris caught a 6-yard touchdown pass from Kenny Pickett to make the lead 7–0.  The Bucs made it 7–3 when Ryan Succop kicked a 30-yard field goal.  Succop got the Bucs closer in the second quarter when he kicked a 27-yard field goal to make it 7–6.  Though, the Steelers pulled away when Chris Boswell kicked a 55-yard field goal to make it 10–6.  As halftime approached, Succop got the Bucs within a point when he kicked a 54-yard field goal to make it 10–9.  In the third quarter, the Steelers got back to work when Boswell kicked a 25-yard field goal to make it 13–9.  Again, the Bucs came within a point when Succop kicked a 24-yard field goal to make it 13–12.  Despite losing Pickett for the game, in the fourth quarter, Mitchell Trubisky came out and threw a 6-yard touchdown pass to Chase Claypool to make it 20–12.  The Bucs would however score the remaining points of the game when Brady found Leonard Fournette on an 11-yard touchdown pass (with a failed 2-point conversion) to make the final score 20–18.

With the win, the Steelers improved to 2–4. It was the Steelers' first home win against the Buccaneers since 2006.

Week 7: at Miami Dolphins

The Dolphins opened a 13–0 lead in the first quarter.  The Steelers were able to shorten the lead to 13–10, but not long before the Dolphins made it 16–10 at halftime.  Both teams went scoreless in the second half, resulting in that final score. With the loss, the Steelers fell to 2–5, and 0–4 against the AFC East.

Week 8: at Philadelphia Eagles

The Steelers traveled to Philadelphia to take on the Eagles.  In the first quarter, the Eagles scored first when Jalen Hurts found A.J. Brown on a 39-yard touchdown pass to make it 7–0.  The Steelers tied it at 7–7 later on in the quarter when Derek Watt found Chase Claypool on a 1-yard touchdown pass.  In the second quarter, the Eagles were able to go up by double digits when Hurts and Brown connected on 2 touchdowns:  from 27 and 29 yards out to make it 21–7.  The Steelers shortened their deficit to 11 when Nick Sciba kicked a 38-yard field goal to make it 21–10 at halftime.  In the third quarter, the Eagles went back to work when Hurts found Zach Pascal on a 34-yard touchdown pass to make it 28–10.  Sciba then got the Steelers closer when he kicked a 29-yard field goal to make it 28–13.  In the fourth quarter, the Eagles scored the only points when Miles Sanders ran for an 11-yard touchdown to make the final score 35–13.

With the loss, the Steelers went into their bye week 2–6.

Week 10: vs. New Orleans Saints

After coming off of their bye week, the Steelers returned home for a game against the Saints.  The Steelers made it 7–0 in the first quarter when George Pickens ran for a 1-yard touchdown.  They made it 10–0 in the second quarter when Matthew Wright kicked a 33-yard field goal.  The Saints were able to tie the game up before halftime at 10–10 when Wil Lutz kicked a 44-yard
field goal, followed up by Andy Dalton and Juwan Johnson hooking up on a 15-yard touchdown pass.  After a scoreless
third quarter, the Steelers scored the remaining points in the fourth when Matthew Wright kicked another 33-yard field goal to make it 13–10 and then finally Kenny Pickett ran for a 1-yard touchdown to make the final score 20–10. This game marked the return of T.J. Watt, who missed the previous 7 games.

With the win, the Steelers improved to 3–6. It was the Steelers' first win against the Saints in Pittsburgh, and their first win against the Saints overall, both since 2006. 

Also with the win, the Steelers have now won at least one game against all other 31 teams since Mike Tomlin's hiring.

Week 11: vs. Cincinnati Bengals

After a tough home win, the Steelers stayed at home for Round 2 against the Bengals.  In the first quarter, the Bengals scored first when Evan McPherson kicked a 45-yard field goal to make it 3–0.  The Steelers then tied it up when Matthew Wright kicked a 42-yard field goal to make it 3–3.  The Bengals then moved back into the lead when Joe Burrow found Samaje Berine on a 29-yard touchdown pass to make it 10–3.  In the second quarter, the Steelers tied the game up at 10–10 when Najee Harris ran for a 19-yard touchdown.  The Bengals then moved into the lead again when Burrow and Berine connected on a 11-yard touchdown pass to make it 17–10.  The Steelers were able to tie it up at 17–17 when Kenny Pickett found George Pickens on a 24-yard touchdown pass.  They took the lead at halftime 20–17 when Wright kicked a 30-yard field goal.  In the third quarter, the Bengals retook the lead when Burrow found Trent Irwin on a 1-yard touchdown pass to make it 24–20.  The Steelers drew closer when Wright kicked a 34-yard field goal to make it 24–23.  The Bengals then pulled away when McPherson kicked a 54-yard field goal to make it 27–23.  In the fourth quarter, the Bengals scored a couple more times:  Burrow and Berine connected for a third time on a 6-yard touchdown pass for a 34–23 lead and then McPherson kicked a 44-yard field goal to make it 37–23.  The Steelers concluded the scoring of the game when Harris ran for a 1-yard touchdown to make the final score 37–30.

With the loss, the Steelers fell to 3–7.  It would be the team's worst 10-game start since 2003 and in turn the worst 10-game start under head coach Mike Tomlin.

Week 12: at Indianapolis Colts

After a tough loss at home, the Steelers traveled for a game against the Colts on Monday Night Football.  The Steelers were able to make a 13–0 lead well into the first 2 quarters by way of Matthew Wright's 45 and 52 yard field goals and then a 6-yard touchdown run by Najee Harris.  The Colts were able to get on the board in the second when Chase McLaughlin kicked a 51-yard field goal to make it 13–3.  The Steelers pulled away as Wright closed the scoring of the first half with another field goal from 25 yards out to make it 16–3 at halftime.  In the third quarter, it was all Colts as they found the end zone twice and were able to take a 17–16 lead:  Johnathan Taylor's 2-yard run followed up by a 6-yard pass from Matt Ryan to Michael Pittman Jr.  The Steelers responded in the fourth quarter by taking the lead back when Benny Snell ran for a 2-yard touchdown pass (with a successful 2-point conversion) to make the final score 24–17.

With the win, the Steelers improved to 4–7.

Week 13: at Atlanta Falcons

After a win on Monday Night Football, the Steelers traveled south to face the Falcons. The Steelers scored the first quarter's only points when Matthew Wright kicked a 46-yard field goal to make it 3–0. They made it 6–0 in the second quarter when Wright kicked another 46-yard field goal. The Falcons got on the board when Younghoe Koo kicked a 51-yard field goal to make it 6–3. The Steelers moved ahead by double digits when Kenny Pickett found Connor Heyward on a 17-yard touchdown pass to make it 13–3. The Falcons came closer when Koo kicked a 51-yard field goal to make it 13–6. The Steelers moved ahead by double digits at halftime when Wright kicked a 48-yard field goal to make it 16–6. After the break, the Steelers went right back to work when Wright kicked a 33-yard field goal to make it 19–6. The Falcons shortened the lead later on in the quarter when Marcus Mariota found MyCole Pruitt on a 7-yard touchdown pass to make it 19–13. In the fourth, they would score the only points when Koo kicked a 28-yard field goal to make it 19–16. Getting the ball back with less than a minute left, the Falcons tried to rally. But Mariota threw the game-losing interception, sealing another Steelers victory.

With the win, the Steelers improved to 5–7.

Week 14: vs. Baltimore Ravens

After a tough win on the road, the Steelers returned home for Round 1 against the Ravens.  The Ravens struck first in the first quarter and made it 3–0 when Justin Tucker kicked a 42-yard field goal.  They made it 10–0 with J.K. Dobbins's 4-yard touchdown run.  Though, the Steelers were able to get on the board by way of Najee Harris's 1-yard touchdown run, making it 10–7.  In the second quarter, the Ravens were able to make it 13–7 before halftime when Tucker kicked a 35-yard field goal.  After a scoreless third quarter, they went back to work in the fourth to increase their lead with Tucker's 30-yard field goal, making it 16–7.  The Steelers wrapped up the scoring of the game when Mitchell Trubisky found Pat Freiermuth on a 10-yard touchdown pass to make the final score 16–14.

With their 4-game winning streak against the Ravens snapped, the Steelers fell to 5–8.

Week 15: at Carolina Panthers

After a tough loss at home, the Steelers traveled to take on the Panthers.  In the first quarter, the Steelers scored the only points when Najee Harris ran for a 7-yard touchdown.  In the second quarter, the Panthers managed to tie it at 7–7 when Sam Darnold found DJ Moore on a 5-yard pass.  The Steelers moved ahead 14–7 by way of Jaylen Warren's to 2-yard touchdown run at halftime.  In the third quarter, the Steelers scored the only points when Mitchell Trubisky ran for a touchdown from a yard out to make it 21–7.  In the fourth quarter, Eddy Pineiro got the Panthers within 8 as he nailed field goals from 29 and 32 yards out, making the score 21–13.  Though, the Steelers moved ahead by double digits again when Chris Boswell kicked a 50-yard field goal to make it 24–13.  The Panthers scored the last points of the game when Pineiro kicked his last field goal from 52-yards out to make the final score 24–16.

With the win, the Steelers improved to 6–8 and kept their very slim postseason hopes alive.

Week 16: vs. Las Vegas Raiders

After a decent road win, the Steelers returned home for another game against the Raiders.  In the first quarter, the Raiders scored the only points when Derek Carr found Hunter Renfrow on a 14-yard touchdown pass to make it 7–0.  In the second quarter, the Steelers got on the board when Chris Boswell kicked a 44-yard field goal to make it 7–3.  The Raiders moved up a touchdown at halftime when Daniel Carlson kicked a 40-yard field goal to make it 10–3.  After a scoreless third quarter, the Steelers scored the remaining points in the fourth, taking the lead in the process:  Boswell's 40-yard field goal, followed by Kenny Pickett's 14-yard touchdown pass to George Pickens to make the eventual final score 13–10.

With the win, the Steelers improved to 7–8.  With the Browns' loss to the Saints earlier in the day, they are now third in the AFC North. The Steelers also beat the Raiders for the first time since 2015 when the Raiders were based in Oakland.

Week 17: at Baltimore Ravens

After a tough win at home, the Steelers headed east for Round 2 against the Ravens.  The Steelers scored the only points of the first quarter when Chris Boswell kicked a 21-yard field goal to make it 3-0.  However, the Ravens responded in the second quarter, taking a 10-3 lead at halftime by way of Justin Tucker's 30-yard field goal and then Tyler Huntley's 7-yard touchdown pass to Isaiah Likely.  The Ravens went right back to work in the second half when Tucker kicked a 51-yard field goal to make it 13-3.  The Steelers scored well into the fourth quarter by way of Boswell's 51-yard field goal, later on in the third.  In the fourth quarter, they followed up with Boswell kicking a 33-yard field goal and Kenny Pickett found Najee Harris on a 10-yard touchdown pass for the Steelers to make the final score 16-13.

With their third straight win, the Steelers improved to 8-8 and kept their postseason hopes alive.  This is also the first career win for Kenny Pickett over a division rival. He also became the first rookie quarterback in NFL history to lead two consecutive game-winning 4th quarter drives.

Week 18: vs. Cleveland Browns

After a tough win on the road, the Steelers returned home for their last game of the season, which would be Round 2 against the Browns.  After a scoreless first quarter, the Browns struck first when Deshaun Watson found David Njoku on a 10-yard touchdown pass to make it 7-0.  The Steelers scored well into the third quarter afterwards.  It started in the second when they tied the game at 7-7 when Kenny Pickett found George Pickens on a 31-yard touchdown pass.  This would be followed by Chris Boswell kicking a 49-yard field goal to make it 10-7 at halftime.  Going back to work in the third, they would score again to make it 20-7 by way of Boswell's 34-yard field goal, followed up by Najee Harris's 4-yard touchdown run.  The Browns came closer in the fourth quarter when Watson found Nick Chubb on a 2-yard touchdown pass to make it 20-14.  However, the Steelers would score the final 8 points of the game when Derek Watt ran for a 1-yard touchdown (with a successful 2-point conversion) to make the final score 28-14.

With their fourth straight win, the Steelers ended their season 9-8.  However, they were eliminated from postseason contention with the Jets' loss to the Dolphins.

Standings

Division

Conference

References

External links
 

Pittsburgh
Pittsburgh Steelers seasons
Pittsburgh Steelers
2020s in Pittsburgh